Shimer is an American surname of German origin.

Shimer may refer to:
Shimer College, a liberal arts college in Chicago, Illinois, in the United States
Shimer, Pennsylvania, a populated place in Northampton County, Pennsylvania

People with the surname Shimer
Brian Shimer, bobsledder
Frances Shimer, founder of the Mount Carroll Seminary
Henry Shimer, entomologist and faculty at Mount Carroll Seminary
Robert Shimer, macroeconomist